David Wiley may refer to:

 David Wiley (mayor) (1768–1812), mayor of Georgetown, District of Columbia
 David A. Wiley, academic at Brigham Young University
 David S. Wiley (conductor) (born 1966), American conductor
 David S. Wiley (sociologist) (born 1935), professor of sociology at Michigan State University
 David Wiley (actor) (1928–2010), American actor
 David Wiley (Maryland politician) (died 1885), American politician

See also
 David Willey (disambiguation)